Vladimír Dlouhý may refer to:

Vladimír Dlouhý (politician) (born 1953)
Vladimír Dlouhý (actor) (1958–2010)